See also Gerald Gardiner, Baron Gardiner

John Gardiner, Baron Gardiner of Kimble (born 17 March 1956) is a British politician. He is a life peer, and has served as Senior Deputy Speaker of the House of Lords since May 2021.

Early life, education and early career

Educated at Uppingham School and Royal Holloway, University of London, he graduated with a BA in Modern History, Economic History and Politics in 1977. He served as private secretary to five successive Chairmen of the Conservative Party between 1989 and 1995, under Prime Ministers Margaret Thatcher and John Major. He has also worked as Director of Political Affairs for the Countryside Alliance, and served on the Quality of Life Commission Rural Affairs Group of the Conservative Party.

House of Lords

On 23 June 2010, Gardiner was raised to the peerage as Baron Gardiner of Kimble, of Kimble in the County of Buckinghamshire.

In 2012, he was appointed a Lord-in-waiting, and served in the Lords as a government whip and spokesman on the Cabinet Office, Business, Innovation and Skills, and Energy and Climate Change.

In May 2015, Gardiner was promoted to be Captain of the Queen's Bodyguard of the Yeomen of the Guard and Government Deputy Chief Whip in the House of Lords. 

In July 2016, he was moved by new Prime Minister Theresa May to be Parliamentary Under-Secretary of State for Rural Affairs and Biosecurity at the Department for Environment, Food and Rural Affairs. He served in this role until 10 May 2021.

On 11 May 2021, Gardiner was appointed as Senior Deputy Speaker of the House of Lords.

He is married to the sculptor Olivia Musgrave. He lives in London and Suffolk and is a partner of the family farm at Kimble in Buckinghamshire. He was Chairman of the Vale of Aylesbury with Garth and South Berks Hunt from 1992 to 2006 and President of the Buckinghamshire County Show 2007.

References

10 Downing Street
Royal Holloway
Parliament profile

1956 births
Living people
Conservative Party (UK) life peers
Life peers created by Elizabeth II
People educated at Uppingham School
Alumni of Royal Holloway, University of London
Conservative Party (UK) Baronesses- and Lords-in-Waiting